Bolshaya Martynovka is a rural locality (a sloboda) and the administrative center of Martynovsky District, Rostov Oblast, Russia. Population:

References

Notes

Sources

Rural localities in Rostov Oblast